Mark E. Cardinal (born May 5, 1961 in Victoria, British Columbia) is a former Canadian national rugby player. He played as a hooker.

Cardinal played 35 times for Canada, from 1986 to 1999, scoring 3 tries, 13 points in aggregate. He played three times at the Rugby World Cup, in 1987, 1995 and 1999.

External links 
Mark Cardinal International Statistics

1961 births
Living people
Sportspeople from Victoria, British Columbia
Canadian rugby union players
Rugby union hookers
Canada international rugby union players